Wynyardiidae is an extinct family of possum-like marsupials from the early Miocene of Wynyard in Tasmania, long been considered to display skeletal features that are intermediate between the primitive polyprotodont and the advanced diprotodont marsupials.

Wynyardia'''s brain is clearly phalangeroid in external morphology, resembling closely that of the extant phalangerid Trichosurus vulpecula.
This indicates that by 21 million years ago, an unambiguously phalangerid brain had evolved within the Diprotodonta family, indicating that both groups had a common ancestor prior to this date. Research on Wynyardia bassiana's relationship with fossil phalangerid species of the Miocene is an ongoing process.

 Species 
 †Wynyardiidae (Osgood 1921)
 †Wynyardia bassiana (Spencer 1901)
 †Muramura williamsi (Pledge in Archer 1987)
 †Muramura pinpensis (Pledge N S 2003)
 †Namilamadeta snideri'' (Rich & Archer 1979)

Notes

References 
 Wildlife of Gondwana, By Patricia Vickers-Rich and Thomas Hewett Rich 1993  Reed.

External links 
 Partial skeleton
 By Neville S. Pledge 2003, A New Species of Muranura

Pleistocene mammals of Australia
Prehistoric vombatiforms
Oligocene first appearances
Miocene extinctions
Prehistoric mammal families